Frew is a surname. Notable people with the surname include:

Alan Frew, lead singer for the Canadian band, Glass Tiger
Alex Frew, a Scottish born rugby union player
Andrew Frew, Australian rugby league player
Anita Frew, Scottish businesswoman
Donald H. Frew, a Wiccan Elder and High Priest of Coven Trismegiston in Berkeley, California
Harding Frew, an Australian civil engineer primarily concerned with engineering projects in Queensland
Irv Frew, a Scottish-born Canadian ice hockey player
James Frew, several people
Joseph Frew (born 1873), Scottish footballer
Kevin Frew, an American lacrosse player
Matthew Frew, 1st World War flying ace, senior RAF officer
Paul Frew, politician, member of the Northern Ireland Assembly
Peggy Frew, Australian author
Steve Frew, a Scottish gymnast
Wendy Frew, New Zealand netball player

Surnames